Aphis oestlundi is a species of aphid in the family Aphididae.

References

Further reading

 

oestlundi
Articles created by Qbugbot
Insects described in 1927